Brittney Palmer (born June 24, 1987) is an American ring girl, model and artist. She is best known for her work as an octagon girl for the UFC, being awarded Ringcard Girl of the Year at the World MMA Awards in 2012, 2013, 2019, and 2022.

Early life
Palmer started her performing arts career dancing professionally for the shows "Jubilee" at Bally's Las Vegas and “X Burlesque” at Flamingo Las Vegas.  After a car accident left Brittney bed-ridden she started working on her art before moving to Los Angeles and studying art history and classic portraiture working with acrylics, oils, and aerosols at the University of California, Los Angeles. Various exhibits have featured her work at institutions and galleries in Los Angeles, Miami, New York, Hong Kong and Milan.

Career
On April 19, 2011, Palmer appeared on YouTube opposite model Jo Garcia, in a Mortal Kombat themed video, which has, as of September 2013, garnered over 600,000 hits.  In 2012 Palmer appeared on the cover of the March issue of Playboy, making her the third ring girl to do so, preceded by Rachelle Leah and Arianny Celeste.  At the 2012 World MMA Awards, Palmer was awarded Ring Card Girl of the Year, prevailing over Arianny Celeste for the 2012 award while simultaneously ending Celeste's winning streak.

Philanthropy
Palmer has raised over $100,000 in donations through her paintings with some of the biggest organizations, charities, and auctions in the World, most notably the AMFAR Galas in Milan, Hong Kong, NYC and Sardinia. She has been an artist ambassador with UNICEF, Steven Tyler of Aerosmith‘s Janie’s Fund, Generation Cure, and Lady Gaga‘s Born This Way Foundation. Palmer has exhibited her paintings alongside influential artists including Pablo Picasso, Damien Hirst, Kaws, Ai Weiwei, Mr Brainwash, Ellen Von Unwerth and Andy Warhol.

References

External links 

1987 births
Living people
American female models
Mixed martial arts people
21st-century American women